is the third studio album by Japanese idol duo Pink Lady, released through Victor Entertainment on February 5, 1979. It is a concept album using traveling as a motif.

The album peaked at No. 27 on Oricon's weekly albums chart and sold over 18,000 copies.

Track listing

Charts

References

External links
 
 
 

1979 albums
Japanese-language albums
Pink Lady (band) albums
Concept albums
Victor Entertainment albums